European route E001 is a European B class road in Georgia and Armenia part of the United Nations international E-road network, connecting the cities Marneuli - Sadakhlo - Bagratashen - Vanadzor.

Route 
 
: Marneuli - Sadakhlo
 
: Bagratashen - Vanadzor

External links 
 UN Economic Commission for Europe: Overall Map of E-road Network (2007)

International E-road network
Roads in Georgia (country)
E001